Kuching Division is one of the twelve administrative divisions in Sarawak, Malaysia. Formerly part of what was called the "First Division", it is the center and the starting point of modern Sarawak. Kuching Division has a total area of 4,559.5 square kilometres.

Kuching Division consists of three administrative districts; Kuching, Bau and Lundu and two subdistricts; Padawan, and Sematan.

Demographics 
The population of Kuching Division (year 2010 census) was 705,546. This makes Kuching Division the most populated division in Sarawak. Most of the residents in Kuching Division live in Kuching District.

Ethnics 
Kuching Division is a melting pot of Sarawak diverse multi-racial society. However, the ethnic composition of Kuching Division is somewhat different compared to the whole Sarawak. Malay and Chinese form majority groups in Kuching, while in the whole Sarawak, Iban and Chinese. Basically, it is traditionally a home to Chinese, Malay and Bidayuh people. Most Chinese are of Hakka and Hokkien descent while some are Foochow and Teochew. They live mostly at urban and suburban areas. Kuching Division has the highest number of Malay people in Sarawak. Most Sarawakian Malays originated from Kuching Division. They are scattered all throughout Kuching Division, with exception of rural areas of Padawan sub-district. Kuching Division is also a home to the largest Bidayuh community. Like Sarawakian Malays, most Sarawakian Bidayuhs are from Kuching Division. They form a majority group in Bau district of Kuching. Other significant minority in Kuching Division are Iban and Melanau. Most of them originated outside Kuching. However, the earliest Iban settlement in Kuching can be found at Kampung Siol Kandis, Petra Jaya, Kuching. Most Melanau people who reside in Kuching have assimilated into Malay society due to professing Islam. Some of them have no longer speak in Bahasa Melanau due to the assimilation. Kuching people also mainly speak Bahasa Sarawak which is similar to the Malaysia's official language of Bahasa Malaysia.

Economy 

Kuching Division is a home to Sarawak capital city, Kuching. It is a centre of business, commercial, mixed industries, service sectors, education hub and tourism centre for Sarawak. Kuching relies heavily on its productive population to run its economy, rather than exploiting its natural resources.

Government

Administration

Members of Parliament

Transportation 

Kuching Division is a centre of transportation sectors in Sarawak, with exception of river transportation. It has wide range of transportation services such as by air (via Kuching International Airport), land (via its vast road networks) and river.

More article at Kuching Transportation.

Infrastructure 

Kuching Division has the widest and most extensive road networks in Sarawak. Pan-Borneo Highway is a trunk road linking Kuching to the rest of divisions in Sarawak. Kuching Division is also a home to world-class convention centre, named Borneo Convention Centre Kuching (BCCK).

Sports and games 

Kuching Division is home to the oldest golf course in Sarawak, which is Sarawak Golf Club. There are also various other golf clubs throughout Kuching Division. Sports amenities can be found at many parts in Kuching with Stadium Sarawak being the largest stadium in Sarawak while Stadium Perpaduan being the largest indoor stadium in Sarawak. Variety of sports and games can be observed being played in Sarawak. Most of them are state-level games and competitions.

Education 

Kuching Division offers wide variety of education regardless of level of education. There are countless public schools, including privileged school such as Sekolah Menengah Teknik (two of them), Sekolah Menengah Agama (three of them), Sekolah Menengah Sains and Maktab Rendah Sains MARA. Kuching Division also has two private international schools, namely Lodge School and Tunku Putra International School.

Kuching Division is also a higher education heaven. It has a lot of training institutions from medical schools, teacher training colleges, custom academy and the upcoming immigration academy. There are few private higher institution such as Swinburne University, Sunway College, SEGi College Sarawak, Masterskill College and ICATS . It is also within a reach to Universiti Malaysia Sarawak (UNIMAS) and Universiti Teknologi MARA, both in Samarahan.

Healthcare 

Kuching Division is also a popular destination for seeking better healthcare. People around Sarawak normally seek better medical treatment in Kuching Division due to its extensive medical facilities. It houses the biggest public hospital in East Malaysia, named Sarawak General Hospital and also one of only two heart surgery institution in Malaysia named Pusat Jantung HUS.

Private hospital does also make presence in Kuching such as Normah Hospital, located at Petra Jaya, Kuching, Timberland Medical Centre (situated in 3rd Mile area, Kuching), Kuching Specialist Centre (at Tabuan Laru, Kuching) and Borneo Medical Center (at Jalan Simpang Tiga, Kuching). Many private clinics open their business in Kuching making Kuching a perfect medical tourism hub.

Public healthcare clinics and policlinic does also exist in Kuching Division. Most healthcare clinics are located at Kuching city outskirts and rural communal areas.

Security 

Kuching Division is a state headquarters for police and army in Sarawak. Various police stations and police beats can be found all over Kuching District. Military base of Penrissen houses the largest military base in Sarawak.

Government services 

Kuching Division is the headquarters for many government agencies. For federal government agencies headquarters, most of them are located at Simpang Tiga (Bangunan Sultan Iskandar), Kuching while state government agencies headquarters are mostly scattered at various buildings in Petra Jaya, Kuching (Wisma Bapa Malaysia).

See also
 Sarawak
 Kuching District

References

External links
 Kuching Resident Office
 Kuching Tourism
 Kuching Info